Just Visiting may refer to:

 Just Visiting (album series), a 2002 EP series by Cog
 Just Visiting (Cog album), a 2008 compilation rerelease of the EPs
 Just Visiting (band), an American Christian rock band, some of whose members later formed the band The Elms
 Just Visiting (The Elms album), 1998
 Just Visiting (film), a 2001 comedy film
 "Just Visiting" (Birds of a Feather), an episode of Birds of a Feather